The Canton of Albertville-Nord is a French former administrative subdivision, situated in the Savoie département and the Rhône-Alpes région. It was created in 1973. It was disbanded following the French canton reorganisation which came into effect in March 2015. In 2012, the population was 15,530.

The Canton of Albertville-Nord consisted of the following communes:

 Albertville (partly)
 Allondaz
 Césarches
 Mercury
 Pallud
 Thénésol
 Venthon

References 

Albertville-Nord
2015 disestablishments in France
States and territories disestablished in 2015